Micridium is a genus of beetles belonging to the family Ptiliidae.

The species of this genus are found in Europe and America.

Species:
 Micridium angulicolle (Fairmaire, 1858) 
 Micridium attenboroughi Darby, 2017

References

Ptiliidae